Zoolandia is a zoo located Lieto, Finland, about a 20-minute drive north of Turku. The zoo is home to about 160 animals representing 50 species.

References

External links
 
 

Lieto
Zoos in Finland